The 2012 season was the Arizona Cardinals' 93rd in the National Football League, their 25th in Arizona, and their sixth and final season under head coach Ken Whisenhunt. After a surprising 4–0 start, which included a major upset of the New England Patriots in week 2, the Cardinals lost 11 of their final 12 games, and missed the playoffs for a third consecutive season, resulting in the firing of head coach Ken Whisenhunt after six seasons. This was Rod Graves last season as general manager of the Cardinals. A day after the final game of the regular season, he was fired after 6 seasons.

2012 draft class

Staff

Final roster

Preseason

Schedule

Regular season

Schedule
{| class="wikitable" style="text-align:center"
|-
! style=""| Week
! style=""| Date
! style=""| Opponent
! style=""| Result
! style=""| Record
! style=""| Venue
! style=""| Recap
|- style="background:#cfc; text-align:center;"
! 1
| September 9
| Seattle Seahawks
| W 20–16
| 1–0
| University of Phoenix Stadium
| Recap
|- style="background:#cfc; text-align:center;"
! 2
| September 16
| at New England Patriots
| W 20–18
| 2–0
| Gillette Stadium
| Recap
|- style="background:#cfc; text-align:center;"
! 3
| September 23
| Philadelphia Eagles
| W 27–6
| 3–0
| University of Phoenix Stadium
| Recap
|- style="background:#cfc; text-align:center;"
! 4
| September 30
| Miami Dolphins
| W 24–21 
| 4–0
| University of Phoenix Stadium
| Recap
|- style="background:#fcc; text-align:center;"
! 5
| 
| at St. Louis Rams
| L 3–17 
| 4–1
| Edward Jones Dome
| Recap
|- style="background:#fcc; text-align:center;"
! 6
| October 14
| Buffalo Bills
| L 16–19 
| 4–2
| University of Phoenix Stadium
| Recap
|- style="background:#fcc; text-align:center;"
! 7
| October 21
| at Minnesota Vikings
| L 14–21
| 4–3
| Hubert H. Humphrey Metrodome
| Recap
|- style="background:#fcc; text-align:center;"
! 8
| 
| San Francisco 49ers
| L 3–24
| 4–4
| University of Phoenix Stadium
| Recap
|- style="background:#fcc; text-align:center;"
! 9
| November 4
| at Green Bay Packers
| L 17–31
| 4–5
| Lambeau Field
| Recap
|-
! 10
|colspan="6" style="text-align:center;"| Bye
|- style="background:#fcc; text-align:center;"
! 11
| November 18
| at Atlanta Falcons
| L 19–23
| 4–6
| Georgia Dome
| Recap
|- style="background:#fcc; text-align:center;"
! 12
| November 25
| St. Louis Rams
| L 17–31
| 4–7
| University of Phoenix Stadium
| Recap
|- style="background:#fcc; text-align:center;"
! 13
| December 2
| at New York Jets
| L 6–7
| 4–8
| MetLife Stadium
| Recap
|- style="background:#fcc; text-align:center;"
! 14
| December 9
| at Seattle Seahawks
| L 0–58
| 4–9
| CenturyLink Field
| Recap
|- style="background:#cfc; text-align:center;"
! 15
| December 16
| Detroit Lions
| W 38–10
| 5–9
| University of Phoenix Stadium
| Recap
|- style="background:#fcc; text-align:center;"
! 16
| December 23
| Chicago Bears
| L 13–28
| 5–10
| University of Phoenix Stadium
| Recap
|- style="background:#fcc; text-align:center;"
! 17
| December 30
| at San Francisco 49ers
| L 13–27
| 5–11
| Candlestick Park
| Recap
|}Note: Intra-division opponents are in bold''' text.

Game summaries

Week 1: vs. Seattle Seahawks

The Cardinals began their season at home against their divisional rival Seahawks with quarterback John Skelton at the starting helm. The team started their season 1–0 despite Skelton finishing the game 14/28 for 149 yards and an interception. Kevin Kolb later on made a appearance in relief of Skelton going 6/8 for 66 yards and a touchdown pass.

Week 2: at New England Patriots

In a huge upset at Gillette Stadium, the Cardinals beat the Patriots to become 2–0. This was the Cardinals' first win against the Patriots since 1991.

Week 3: vs. Philadelphia Eagles

With the win, the Cardinals started 3–0 for the first time since 1974.

Week 4: vs. Miami Dolphins

Week 5: at St. Louis Rams

This was the Cardinals' 700th loss. They became the first team in NFL history to do this.

Week 6: vs. Buffalo Bills

With the tough loss, the Cardinals fell to 4–2 and also with the Seahawks' win over the Patriots and the 49ers' loss to the Giants, the team remained in a tie for first place in the NFC West.

Week 7: at Minnesota Vikings

Week 8: vs. San Francisco 49ers

Week 9: at Green Bay Packers

Losing their fifth straight game of the season by remaining winless at Lambeau Field (0–7), the Cardinals headed into their bye week at 4–5.

Week 11: at Atlanta Falcons

Week 12: vs. St. Louis Rams

Week 13: at New York Jets

Week 14: at Seattle Seahawks

With the loss, the Cardinals were not only eliminated from postseason contention and also falling to 4–9, but the 58-point loss was the worst in franchise history. They committed 8 turnovers, which was the most that the Cardinals have ever committed in a game. Arizona only had 154 yards of total offense while the defense gave up 493 yards.

The Cardinals also became the first team in NFL history to lose 9 consecutive games after starting 4–0.

Week 15: vs. Detroit Lions

With this win the Cardinals ended their 9 game losing streak.

Week 16: vs. Chicago Bears

Week 17: at San Francisco 49ers

With this loss, the Cardinals surpassed the 1989 Chicago Bears for the worst record by an NFL team starting 4–0.

Standings

Footnotes

References

External links
 

Arizona
Arizona Cardinals seasons
Arizona